Ophichthus manilensis is an eel in the family Ophichthidae (worm/snake eels). It was described by Albert William Herre in 1923. It is a marine, tropical eel which is known from the Philippines, in the western central Pacific Ocean.

References

manilensis
Taxa named by Albert William Herre
Fish described in 1923